Bourail  is a commune in the South Province of New Caledonia, an overseas territory of France in the Pacific Ocean.

Geography 
Bourail is a rural town of Grande Terre, New Caledonia's main island. The municipality stretches between the mountain ranges running the length of New Caledonia down to the sea. Beaches attract tourists but have retained their natural landscapes, and are popular with surfers. The town lies at the confluence of several rivers, is the crossroads of many valleys including Boghen, Bacouya, Nessadiou, Nera, Tene and La Pouéo.

The territory of the municipality has various natural landscapes:

 Mining landscapes
 Landscapes of valleys and alluvial plains making Bourail the capital of rural New Caledonia
 Coastal mangroves
 The coastline also includes surf beaches and calmer beaches protected by the outer coral reef
 seascapes including reefs and passes
With a density of 6 inhabitants / km ², Bourail has a mix rural and town life.

Climate
Bourail has a tropical monsoon climate (Köppen climate classification Am).

Toponymy 
Bourail means "lizard's tail".

This comes from bu rhaï in the Ajie language, bu meaning "tail" and rhaï "the lizard".

Coat of arms 

 The two casings represent the Kanak population
 The crescent moon represents the Muslim population
 Blue Cross is the cemetery of New Zealand
 The Bird is the yellow-legged Thrush Moluccan imported control such invasions of locusts
 head of livestock and the Sheaf of Wheat represents the farming community

Slogan 
The slogan of Bourail used for tourism is "Bourail, land of emotions."

Population and Society

Demography 
5,531 inhabitants (2019)

The average age of the population is under 30 years.

Most young people from Bourail continue their studies in Nouméa. To mitigate this requirement, the town has seen several more schools built. There are about 2,000 children attending schools up to high school level, but there is no university.

The inhabitants are called Bouraillais(es), they are nicknamed "Pattes Jaunes", literally "yellow legs" (referring to one of the birds of the region: common Mynas).

Schools 

College Louis-Léopold Djiet
Private College Sacré-Coeur
Private vocational school Père Guéneau (LPPG-mechanical) and François d'Assise (LPFA-sector)
Saint-Joseph school (private elementary school)
Lys d'eau school (maternal + CP-CE1)
Louise-Michel school (primary school)

Culture 

 Church of Bourail
 Museum of Bourail
 Cinema
 Library
 The Colisé (theater)
 Music school

Sports grounds 

 Football stadium
 Sports hall
 Gymnasium
 Tennis courts

People related to Bourail 
The Pole Antoni Berezowski, who in 1867 tried in Paris to assassinate the emperor Alexander II of Russia, lived in exile in Bourail from 1886 until his death in 1916.

Policy and administration

Kanak tribes 
 Pothé tribe
 Azareu tribe
 Bouirou tribe
 Ny tribe
 Boregahou tribe
 Gouaro tribe
 Oua-Oué tribe

Districts 

 Roche Percée
 Poé
 Gouaro
 Téné
 FSH (Bourail)
 Nandai
 Nessadiou
 Boghen

Sister cities
 Waimate, New Zealand

Economy

Agriculture 

Agriculture has historically been the mainstay of the community. Livestock consists mainly of cattle but also pigs, deer, poultry and beekeeping. Maize and potatoes are the main arable crops, while subsistence farming is also common. The town is often considered the "capital of the Bush" (referring to the rural area of New Caledonia outside of Nouméa and its satellite towns), particularly through the annual Bourail Agricultural Fair.

Tourism 

The beaches are open to all activities of the sea and the lagoon. During spawning season, several species of turtles nest on the beaches, and the nests are tagged and guarded. On the beach of Roche Percee, crates are arranged in nests by volunteers to protect the eggs until they hatch. On this coast there are both surf beaches and areas of water sheltered by reefs. Divers can explore the underwater wonders that are now a UNESCO World Heritage of Humanity.

In the provincial domain of Gouaro Deva, a huge project combining business, ecology and tourism aims to create, in the northern reaches of the South Province, a hub of integrated and sustainable development. While a Sheraton hotel and golf course have been constructed, as well as walking and mountain bike tracks, development is continuing as of 2015 with several projects at various stages of completion.

Sites and monuments 

 Museum of Bourail
 Fellow of Bourail
 Turtle Bay
 Gouaro Deva
 Arab Cemetery
 New Zealand Cemetery of the Second World War

Events

Agricultural fair of Bourail 

The Bourail Agricultural Fair (FEAAB) takes place every year in mid August, and is the largest annual event in New Caledonia. The event is best known for its rodeo, but also features arts and crafts, equestrian events, livestock judging, woodchopping, as well as farm machinery and commercial stands. The fair takes place on the racecourse at Téné, outside the village of Bourail, and generally attracts 20-25,000 visitors over its 3 days.

Fireworks 
A fireworks display takes place every year on or about July 14 at the public square in the village.

Torch Pacific Games 2011 NC 
Following the organization of the Pacific Games in New Caledonia, the "flame of the Games' passed through several municipalities of the island, including Bourail August 21, 2011. Jean-Pierre AIFA, then Mayor of Bourail, was present and the committee chair Pascale Bastien-Thiry and torchbearers. The flame arrived on horseback and was positioned on the podium near the stadium where speeches and a balloon release took place. Several events and booths were present at the Sports Hall during this special day.

References

External links

Communes of New Caledonia